Elisabeth Christine Berling (1744-1801) was a Danish businessperson.

She was the daughter of the printer Andreas Hartvig Godiche and the printer Anna Magdalena Godiche and married the printer and brewer Georg Christopher Berling in 1772.

In 1778, she took over the printing business of her late spouse.  It had the royal privilege and monopoly to print political documents, and publish official announcements of the crown in its newspaper Berlingske Tidende. She personally launched the cultural magazine Laerde Erfterretninger, which was the leading literary magazine in Denmark of its time.  In addition to the Berling printing press, she also inherited the printing business of her mother in 1781. Elisabeth Christine Berling was a major figure within the Danish media world of her time.

In addition to the two printing firms, she also managed the brewery of her late husband, which was one of the biggest and most lucrative breweries in Copenhagen of its time. Of the many female brewers in Copenhagen in her time, only Berling and Marie Martine Bonfils were counted among the truly rich.

See also
 List of women printers and publishers before 1800

References

1801 deaths
1744 births
18th-century Danish businesspeople
18th-century Danish businesswomen
18th-century Danish publishers (people)
Danish printers
Women printers